The Slovenian Philharmonic Orchestra (Simfonični orkester Slovenske filharmonije) is a Slovenian orchestra based in Ljubljana.  Its primary concert venues are Marjan Kozina Hall in Philharmonic Hall, Ljubljana, at Congress Square and Gallus Hall in the Cankar Centre at Republic Square in Ljubljana.

The roots of the orchestra go back to 1701, to the founding of the Academia Philharmonicorum, which performed oratorios and other works of the era. This organisation then became the Philharmonic Society (Filharmonična družba) in 1794.  On 23 October 1908, the Filharmonična družba officially merged with the Glasbena matica (The Music Society) to form the first incarnation of the Slovenian Philharmonic Orchestra, which lasted from 1908 to 1913. In 1947, the re-establishment of a new incarnation of the orchestra was initiated. The new version of the orchestra gave its first concert on January 13, 1948, conducted by Salvador Bacarisse and attended by composer Marjan Kozina, who became the first administrator of the Slovenian Philharmonic Orchestra.

The orchestra employed a number of "permanent conductors" (stalni dirigenti) from its 1948 re-inception, including Jakov Cipci (1948–1955), Samo Hubad (1948–1966), Bogo Leskovic (1951–1958), and Lovro von Matačić (1955–1956). Oskar Danon was the first conductor to have the title of principal conductor of the orchestra, from 1970 to 1974. The first non-Slovenian principal conductor of the orchestra was George Pehlivanian, from 2005 to 2008. From 2013 to 2015, the principal conductor of the orchestra was Canadian-born Keri-Lynn Wilson, the first female principal conductor in the orchestra's history.  The orchestra's most recent principal conductor was Uroš Lajovic, from 2015 to 2017..

Principal conductors
 Oskar Danon (1970–1974)
 Uroš Lajovic (1974–1975; acting principal conductor)
 Marko Letonja (1996–2002)
 George Pehlivanian (2005–2008)
 Emmanuel Villaume (2008–2013)
 Keri-Lynn Wilson (2013–2015)
 Uroš Lajovic (2015–2017)

References

External links
Official orchestra webpage

Slovenian orchestras
Cultural organizations based in Ljubljana
1948 establishments in Slovenia